A Cork County Council election was held in County Cork in Ireland on 24 May 2019 as part of that year's local elections. All 55 councillors were elected for a five-year term of office from 10 local electoral areas (LEAs) by single transferable vote.

This election coincides with a transfer of land around Cork city from the administration of the County Council to that of Cork City Council. Several outgoing county councillors, based in areas transferred to the city, are standing in the city council election. Compared to the previous election in 2014, the total number of councillors is unchanged, but following the recommendation of the 2018 Boundary Committee, there were significant changes to the LEAs, taking account of the transfer of land to the city, a maximum of 7 seats per LEA in its terms of reference, and population shifts revealed by the 2016 census.

Compared with the previous election, in 2014, Fianna Fáil increased its seat number by 1 to 18 and also polled more votes than Fine Gael. However, Fine Gael gained an additional 4 seats to emerge as the largest party with 20 seats. Both parties benefitted from the collapse of Sinn Féin who only returned with 2 seats, a loss of 8. However, there had been many defections within the party in the years since 2014 and several Councillors did not seek re-election. Independents won 10 seats, the same total as in 2014. The Green Party gained 2 seats in the Cobh and Midleton LEAs. After a recount, Holly McKeever Cairns won a seat in Bantry-West Cork for the Social Democrats.

Results by party

Results by local electoral area

Bandon–Kinsale

Bantry–West Cork

Carrigaline

Cobh

Fermoy

Kanturk

Macroom

Mallow

Midleton

Skibbereen–West Cork

Changes Since 2019 Local Elections
† Cobh Fianna Fáil Cllr Pádraig O'Sullivan was elected as a Teachta Dála (TD) for Cork North-Central at the by-election in November 2019. Sheila O'Callaghan was co-opted to fill the vacancy on 24 February 2020.
†† Bantry-West Cork Social Democrats Cllr Holly Cairns was elected as a TD for Cork South-West at the 2020 general election. Ross O'Connell was co-opted to fill the vacancy on 24 February 2020.
††† Midleton Fianna Fáil Cllr James O'Connor was elected as a TD for Cork East at the 2020 general election. Ann Marie Ahern was co-opted to fill the vacancy on 24 February 2020.
†††† Skibbereen-West Cork Fianna Fáil Cllr Christopher O'Sullivan was elected a TD for Cork South-West at the 2020 general election. Deirdre Kelly was co-opted to fill the vacancy on 24 February 2020.
††††† Skibbereen West Cork Sinn Féin Cllr Paul Hayes quit the party and became an Independent on 5 May 2020 citing disillusionment.

Footnotes

Sources

References

2019 Irish local elections
2019